Queens Well is a populated place in Pima County, Arizona.

References 

Populated places in Pima County, Arizona